The Cabinet of Kuwait is the chief executive body of the State of Kuwait. The following cabinet is the 37th in the history of Kuwait, after the previous cabinet resigned on 6 December 2020. On 8 December 2020, Amir of Kuwait Sheikh Nawaf Al-Ahmad Al-Jaber Al-Sabah assigned Sheikh Sabah Al-Khaled Al-Hamad Al-Sabah as Prime Minister . The Amir has also assigned the Prime Minister to refer the cabinet line-up for their appointment.
On 14 December, the Prime Minister formed the new cabinet and the Amir issued a decree on the formation of the government. The new cabinet includes seven newcomers, three former ministers and six member including the premier himself from the previous cabinet. On 12 January 2021, the Ministers of the Cabinet tendered in their resignations to the Prime Minister. On 13 January 2021, the Prime Minister submitted the government's resignation to the Amir. On 18 January 2021, the Amir accepted the resignation of the Prime Minister and his government. The cabinet will be proceeding in a care taking manner until the formation of the new cabinet.

Official Amiri Decree published in Official Gazette/Kuwait Digest

See also
Cabinet of Kuwait
35th Cabinet of Kuwait
36th Cabinet of Kuwait
38th Cabinet of Kuwait

References

External links
Current Ministerial Formation (Council of Ministers General Secretariat)
Official English names of Kuwaiti ministers and ministries (Kuwaiti Government)

Kuwait
Government of Kuwait